The Best... Ever! is a series of compilation albums. The albums in this series have been released by EMI beginning in 2004. It is very popular in Poland. To date more than 900,000 copies of compilations had been sold in Poland. The last part of the series has been released on May 22, 2009.

Released compilations
(2004) The Best Smooth Jazz... Ever!
(2005) The Best Smooth Jazz... Ever! vol. 2
(2005) The Best Classics... Ever!
(2006) The Best Smooth Jazz... Ever! vol. 3
(2006) The Best Samba... Ever!
(2006) The Best Christmas... Ever!
(2007) The Best Rock Ballads... Ever!
(2007) The Best Disco... Ever!
(2007) The Best Classics... Ever! vol. 2
(2007) The Best Polish Songs... Ever!
(2008) The Best Love... Ever!
(2008) The Best Kids... Ever!
(2008) The Best Film... Ever!
(2009) The Best Polish Love Songs... Ever!
(2009) The Best Smooth Jazz... Ever! vol. 4

 
Compilation album series